The Boys' 81 kg competition at the 2018 Summer Youth Olympics was held on 8 October at the Asia Pavilion.

Schedule
All times are in local time (UTC-3).

Results
Legend

1st number — Ippon
2nd number — Waza-ari
s — Shido

Main Bracket

Repechage

Final standings

References
 Draw

B81
Judo at the Youth Olympics Boys' 81 kg